99 Speedmart is a Malaysian chain of convenience stores and is one of the largest mini market chain in the country, before KK Super Mart. Colloquially referred to as 99 by locals. It was founded by Lee Thiam Wah in 1987 as a traditional sundry store in Klang, Selangor. After the rebranding of 99 Market to 99 Speedmart in 2000, the company expanded with a new store opening at Batu Belah, Klang. Since its inception, 99 Speedmart has evolved from a single mini market to the largest mini market retail chain in Malaysia.  

On 14 December 2019, it launched its first store in Singapore at 110 Sims Avenue. The milestone marks 99 Speedmart's first international expansion and is a testament to 99 Speedmart's slogan of "Near n' Save" or "Dekat lagi Murah" in Malay. 

As of 22 November 2020, 99 Speedmart has more than 1,750 outlets. A significant majority of them are located in the west coast of Peninsular Malaysia with a growing presence in Sabah and Sarawak.

References

External links 
 
 
 

1987 establishments in Malaysia
Retail companies established in 1987
Variety stores
Malaysian brands
Privately held companies of Malaysia
Malaysian companies established in 1987